Baishi Town may refer to:

Baishi, Xiangtan, an urban town in Xiangtan County, Xiangtan City, Hunan Province
Baishi, Changshan, an urban town in Changshan County, Quzhou City, Zhejiang Province